The Lourdes SIGINT (Signals Intelligence) facility, located near Havana, Cuba, was the largest facility of its kind operated by Soviet and later Russian foreign intelligence services
outside of Russia. Construction began in July 1962.

The station closed in August 2002.

All station facilities were shut down, the buildings were abandoned and later reconstructed to become the University of Information Science.

At its peak during the Cold War over 1,500 KGB, GRU, Cuban DGI, and Eastern Bloc technicians, engineers and intelligence operatives staffed the facility. In 2000 it was reported that China signed an agreement with the Cuban government to share use of the facility for its own intelligence agency.

The base closed in 2002. Russia had paid Cuba a $200 million annual subsidy from 1962 to 2002.

In July 2014 reports surfaced that Russia and Cuba had agreed to reopen the facility for usage by Russian intelligence.

In popular culture
 The station was a key plot device in the August 28, 2012 episode of the USA television network series Covert Affairs episode "Loving the Alien".
 The station was briefly mentioned in the April 9, 2017 airing of the NCIS: Los Angeles episode entitled "From Havana with Love"

References

External links
Satellite Imagery of Lourdes from Global Security
FAS site on Lourdes

1962 establishments in Cuba
2002 disestablishments in Cuba
Military installations of the Soviet Union in other countries
Buildings and structures in Havana
Cuba–Soviet Union relations
Cuba–Russia relations
20th-century architecture in Cuba